Bryan Robert Rekar (born June 3, 1972) is a former American professional baseball pitcher who played for the Colorado Rockies, Tampa Bay Devil Rays, and Kansas City Royals of Major League Baseball (MLB) during an 8-year career.

Career

Colorado Rockies
Selected in the second round of the 1993 amateur draft by the Rockies, he would wind up called up to the majors by them in 1995, pitching in 15 games. He would spend the next two seasons with the club compiling a 7-10 record with a 6.54 ERA.

Tampa Bay Devil Rays
In 1998, he wound up being drafted by the expansion team Tampa Bay Devil Rays. In 2000, he set a career high in wins (7), ERA (4.41), innings pitched (173.1) and starts (27).

2001 would not be his best season. He went 13 straight starts without recording a win. He finished that season with a 3-13 record and a 5.89 ERA in 25 starts. After that he was released from the team.

Kansas City Royals
In 2002, he signed a deal with the Kansas City Royals. Rekar only made 2 starts with the Royals, allowing 12 runs in those starts. After that, he was released from his contract and signed a minor league deal with his former club the Rockies, for which he latched on for the rest of that 2002 season.

Independent league
Rekar pitched for the Long Island Ducks for 2 years, compiling an 11–8 record.

External links

1972 births
Living people
American expatriate baseball players in Mexico
Baseball players from Illinois
Bend Rockies players
Bradley Braves baseball players
Central Valley Rockies players
Colorado Rockies players
Colorado Springs Sky Sox players
Durham Bulls players
Kansas City Royals players
Long Island Ducks players
Major League Baseball pitchers
Mexican League baseball pitchers
New Haven Ravens players
Omaha Royals players
Orlando Rays players
People from Oak Lawn, Illinois
St. Petersburg Devil Rays players
Tampa Bay Devil Rays players
Tigres de la Angelopolis players